Hairston may refer to:

American baseball family 
 Sam Hairston (1920–1997), former Major League Baseball player
 Johnny Hairston (born 1944), retired Major League Baseball player
 Jerry Hairston Sr. (born 1952), retired Major League Baseball player
 Jerry Hairston Jr. (born 1976), current Major League Baseball player for the Los Angeles Dodgers
 Scott Hairston (born 1980), current Major League Baseball player for the Washington Nationals

Other people with the surname 
 Al Hairston (born 1945), retired American professional basketball player and college head coach
 Carl Hairston (born 1952), former professional American football player
 Curtis Hairston (1961–1996), American soul/funk vocalist
 Danielle Hairston, American psychiatrist
 George Hairston (1750–1825), gentleman planter, politician, and military officer in the Virginia Colony
 Happy Hairston (1942–2001), American professional basketball player  
 PJ Hairston (born 1992), American professional basketball player
 Jester Hairston (1901–2000), American composer, songwriter, arranger, choral conductor, and actor
 Justise Hairston (born 1983), American professional football player
 Kamesha Hairston (born 1985), American professional basketball player
 Leslie Hairston (born 1961), American politician
 Malik Hairston (born 1987), American basketball player
 Nate Hairston (born 1994), American football player
 Nelson Hairston (1917–2008), American ecologist
 Robert Hairston (1717–1791), gentleman planter, politician, and military officer in the Virginia Colony
 Troy Hairston (born 1998), American football player
 Brother Will Hairston (1919–1988), American gospel singer and preacher

See also